Tashi Tsering (also written Tashi Chirring) is a Nepalese former footballer of Tibetan descent. The defender has played for the Tibet national football team in 1999 and the Nepal national football team in 2005.

Club career
Tsering has played for Manang Marsyangdi for several years and was noted for his strong performances for the club in the AFC President's Cup 2006.

International career
Tsering has appeared for Nepal in two qualifiers for the 2010 FIFA World Cup Qualifiers. He also appeared in five matches for Nepal, scoring once, at the 2006 AFC Challenge Cup, where he played in the semi-final as Nepal lost to Sri Lanka on penalties.

See also
Tibet national football team
Tibetan culture

References

External links

TNFA, team 1999-2000
TNFA, team 2001-2002
 Shaolin Soccer Foot au Tibet, team 2008

Living people
Nepalese footballers
Nepal international footballers
Manang Marshyangdi Club players
Tibetan footballers
Tibet international footballers
Association football defenders
Nepalese people of Tibetan descent
1973 births